Eccrine mucinosis is a cutaneous condition characterized by mucinosis, and described in HIV-infected patients.

See also 
 Perifollicular mucinosis
 List of cutaneous conditions

References 

Mucinoses